Leonard Borejko Chodźko (1800–1871) was a Polish historian, geographer, cartographer, publisher, archivist, and activist of Poland's post-November-1830-Uprising Great Emigration.

Life
Chodźko was educated at the University of Vilnius, where he was a member of the Philomaths, a secret organization established in 1816 by Vilnius University students including Adam Mickiewicz, Tomasz Zan and Józef Jeżowski.

From 1826 he lived in Paris. During France's July 1830 Revolution, he served as aide-de-camp to General La Fayette.

Works

 Histoire des légions polonaises en Italie (1829)
 Histoire populaire de la Pologne (1863)
 Les Polonais en Italie  (1829)
 Tableau de la Pologne ancienne et moderne sous le rapport géographique, statistique, géologique etc. (1830)
 Histoire politique de la Lituanie, depuis la réunion de la Pologne en 1386, jusqu’à son insurrection en 1831 (1831)
 Biographie du géneral Kościuszko (1837)
 Massacres de Galicie et Cracovie confisquée par l'Autriche en 1846 (1861)
 Un évêque polonais, le métropolitain Kazimir Gaspard Colonna Cieciszewski et son temps (1745-1831) (1866)
 Recueil des traités, conventions, actes diplomatiques etc. relatifs à la Pologne, de 1762 á 1862.
 Notice biographique sur Joachim Lelewel ; Paris, 1834
 Le Congrès de Vienne et les traités de 1815, précédés et suivis des actes diplomatiques qui s'y rattachent ; 1863 / 1864 ; éditeur : Amyot ; Paris ; 4 vol.

See also
Léonard Chodzko (French Wikipedia)
Polish Museum, Rapperswil

Notes

External links
 
 Blog Chodźko, Jakob Leonard Borejko

1871 deaths
1800 births
People from Maladzyechna District
People from Oshmyansky Uyezd
19th-century Polish historians
Polish male non-fiction writers
Polish geographers
Polish publishers (people)
Polish cartographers
Activists of the Great Emigration
Vilnius University alumni